Gruča is a small settlement east of Šentjernej in southeastern Slovenia. The area is part of the traditional region of Lower Carniola. It is now included in the Southeast Slovenia Statistical Region.

References

External links
Gruča on Geopedia

Populated places in the Municipality of Šentjernej